The 2003–04 season is Hyderabad cricket team's 70th competitive season. The Hyderabad cricket team is senior men's domestic cricket team based in the city of Hyderabad, India, run by the Hyderabad Cricket Association. They represent the region of Telangana in the state of Andhra Pradesh in domestic competitions.

Competition Overview

Squads

NKP Salve Challenger Trophy
Laxman and Rayudu got picked to the India Seniors squad for the 2003-04 NKP Salve Challenger Trophy, a List-A cricket tournament in India.

 Irani Cup
Laxman got selected to the Rest of India squad for the 2003 Irani Cup, a first-class cricket competition in India.

Deodhar Trophy
Arjun, Vishnuvardhan and Khaleel got selected to the South Zone squad for the 2003-04 Deodhar Trophy, a List-A cricket competition in India.

Duleep Trophy
Khaleel got selected to the South Zone squad for the 2003-04 Duleep Trophy, a first-class cricket tournament in India.

Ranji Trophy

The Hyderabad team, led by Venkatapathy Raju, began their campaign in the Ranji Trophy, the premier first-class cricket tournament in India, with a win against the Gujarat at Ahmedabad on 7 November 2003. They finished inside top-2 in Group B of the Elite League to advance to the Elite semi-final with three wins, a loss and two draws. They were eliminated in the semi-final where the Mumbai defeated the Hyderabad by an innings and 152 runs.

Points Table
Elite Group B

  Top two teams advanced to the knockout stage.
  Bottom team relegated to the Plate Group for the 2004–05 Ranji Trophy.
 Points system : Win by an innings or 10 wickets = 5, Win = 4, Draw with first innings lead = 2, No Result = 2, Draw with first innings deficit = 0, Loss = 0.

Knockout stage

Matches
Group Stage

Semi-final

Statistics
Most runs

 Source: Cricinfo
Most wickets

 Source: Cricinfo

Ranji One–Day Trophy
The Hyderabad team, led by Venkatapathy Raju, began their campaign in the Subbaiah Pillai Trophy as part of the South Zone Ranji One–Day Trophy, a List-A cricket tournament in India, with a loss against the Karnataka at Chennai on 7 January 2004. The five-wickets shared between Dodda Ganesh and Sunil Joshi helped the Karnataka restrict the Hyderabad to 155 while the half-centuries from J. Arunkumar and Joshi completed the chase for the Karnataka with seven wickets to spare. In the second match, the half-centuries from Daniel Manohar and Anirudh Singh gave a strong start to the Hyderabad but the middle-order collapse by Renjith Kumar and the run-outs in the end restricted the Hyderabad total to 237 while the Kerala with the help of the half-centuries from Anish Antony and Hemanth Kumar completed the chase in the penultimate ball with three wickets to spare. The half-centuries from Devishetty Vinay Kumar and Sankinani Vishnuvardhan helped the Hyderabad post 268 while the three-wicket hauls from Inder Shekar Reddy and Tirumalasetti Suman helped them win against the Goa by 101 runs in their third match. In the fourth match, the half-century from Subramaniam Badrinath along with the support from Sadagoppan Ramesh and Jayaraman Madanagopal helped the Tamil Nadu post 249. The Hyderabad started the chase strongly with the half-centuries from Shashank Nag and Ibrahim Khaleel along with the support from Manohar but five run-outs at the end resulted in the Hyderabad fall short by 2 runs as they were bowled out for 247. In the final zonal match, the five-wicket haul from Mohammad Ghouse Baba helped the Hyderabad restrict the Andhra to 230 despite the century from Yalaka Venugopal Rao. In reply, the Hyderabad had a big opening partnership from Manohar and Suman but the middle order collapse and tight bowling by the Andhra left the Hyderabad fall short by 8 runs. This loss resulted the Hyderabad finish fourth in South Zone and fail to qualify for the Ranji ODI Championship with a win and four losses.

Points Table

Matches
Zonal Stage

Statistics
Most runs

 Source: Cricinfo
Most wickets

 Source: Cricinfo

See also
 Hyderabad cricket team
 Hyderabad Cricket Association

References

External links
Hyderabad cricket team official site

Cricket in Hyderabad, India
Cricket in Telangana
Sport in Telangana